The Wichita State Shockers baseball team represents Wichita State University in the sport of baseball. The Wichita State Shockers compete in Division I of the National Collegiate Athletics Association (NCAA) and in the American Athletic Conference after 72 seasons in the Missouri Valley Conference.

The Shockers have made the College World Series seven times, winning the national championship in 1989. Wichita State has the eighth-highest winning percentage in NCAA Division I baseball history at .655. That percentage currently leads the American Athletic Conference.

History

Early years: 1899–1923 
Wichita State, then Fairmount College, played its first college baseball game on April 14, 1899, against Southwestern College. For the first three years, they were coached by Harry Hess, who was also the head football coach at the time.

Over the next two decades, the program would cycle through a number of coaches, none finding particular success or lasting more than 4 years. Wichita would produce two Major League Baseball players during that time in Claude Hendrix and Lloyd Bishop.

After the 1923 season, the baseball program was shut down.

Second stint: 1948–1970 
Having since joined the Missouri Valley Conference, Wichita decided to re-launch their baseball program for the 1948 season. Over the next 23 seasons, Wichita would struggle through a number of coaching changes and middling success, only once finishing at the top of the MVC's West Division.

After the 1970 season, the baseball program was again shut down.

Stephenson era: 1978–2013 
The modern era of Wichita State baseball began in 1977, when Oklahoma Sooners assistant coach Gene Stephenson was hired to run the program beginning with the 1978 season. Stephenson had been recruiting coordinator and hitting instructor for the Sooners under Enos Semore and helped lead Oklahoma to five College World Series appearances.

In just Stephenson's third season, led by three-time All-American Joe Carter, Wichita State qualified for the 1980 NCAA Division I baseball tournament, the first tournament appearance in Shocker history. In his fifth season, Stephenson led the Shockers all the way to the 1982 College World Series, where they lost to the Miami Hurricanes in the championship game. Ultimately, the Shockers won 73 games in 1982, setting the NCAA record for wins in a single season. In 1988, Stephenson again led Wichita State to the College World Series before being eliminated by the Arizona State Sun Devils in the semi-finals.

In 1989, led by All-Americans Eric Wedge, Greg Brummett, Mike Lansing, and Mike McDonald, the Shockers returned to the College World Series and won the national championship, defeating the Texas Longhorns in the championship game. To date, it is the only team national title ever won by a Shocker team in any sport.

From 1991 to 1993, led by multi-year All-Americans Chris Wimmer, Doug Mirabelli, and Darren Dreifort, the Shockers made three consecutive trips to the College World Series, finishing as the runners-up to the LSU Tigers in both 1991 and 1993. Wichita State made their seventh and most-recent tip to the College World Series in 1996.

Since 1996, the Shockers have had quite a bit of success, with 12 NCAA tournament appearances, including Super Regional Appearances in 2007 and 2008, but have failed to reach the same heights they found during the 1980s and 1990s. Since 1980, Wichita State trails only Florida State in total wins and winning percentage

On July 11, 2005, Stephenson announced he was returning to Oklahoma as head coach, but decided to return to Wichita State just hours after his introductory press conference, citing concerns with Oklahoma's scholarship situation.

After 36 years, WSU fired Stephenson on June 4, 2013. Stephenson was fired after making the NCAA tournament for a 28th time, though that appearance was later stripped by the NCAA.

Post-Stephenson era: 2014–present 

Todd Butler was hired as just the second coach of WSU baseball's modern era 12 days after Stephenson was fired.  Butler had served as an assistant at Arkansas over the past eight seasons.  Butler's teams struggled initially, posting losing records in three of his first four seasons, the only three sub-.500 years since Stephenson had restarted the program.

In 2018, third baseman Alec Bohm was drafted in the First Round by the Philadelphia Phillies.  The Shockers won 35 games in 2018, the best season under Butler.

Butler was fired following the 2019 season in which the Shockers finished 28–31 after making the semifinals of the American Athletic Conference Tournament.  Butler finished his six-year tenure with a 169-180-1 record and did not make the NCAA tournament.

In June, 2019, former Shocker All-American catcher, and Pizza Hut Shocker Sports Hall of Famer Eric Wedge was hired as the third baseball coach in Wichita State modern era history.  Wedge led the Shockers to a 13–2 season cut short by the COVID-19 pandemic. The Shockers were ranked 30th in the country when the 2020 season was suspended and were a perfect 10–0 at Eck Stadium.

On April 10, 2021, the Shockers hosted the University of Houston in the first game played at Wichita's Riverfront Stadium.

Head coaches

Year-by-year results

Wichita State in the NCAA tournament
 The NCAA Division I baseball tournament started in 1947.
 The format of the tournament has changed through the years.
 * indicates appearance was vacated by the NCAA.

Individual awards

National awards
 The Sporting News National Player of the Year
Joe Carter - 1981
 Golden Spikes Award
Darren Dreifort - 1993

All Americans

 1979
Joe Carter, OF
 1980
Joe Carter OF
 1981
Joe Carter, OF
Phil Stephenson, 1B
 1982
Russ Morman, DH
Bryan Oelkers, P
Phil Stephenson, 1B
 1983
Russ Morman, 1B
Erik Sonberg, P
 1985
Kevin Penner, OF
 1987
Dave Haas, P
Tim Raley, OF
 1988
Mark Standiford, 2B
 1989
Greg Brummett, P
Mike Lansing, SS
Mike McDonald, OF
Eric Wedge, C
 1991
Billy Hall, 2B
Doug Mirabelli, C
Kennie Steenstra, P
Chris Wimmer, SS

 1992
Darren Dreifort, P
Todd Dreifort, OF
Charlie Giaudrone, P
Doug Mirabelli, C
Scot McCloughan, DH
Chris Wimmer, SS
 1993
Darren Dreifort. P
Joey Jackson, 2B
 1994
Shane Dennis, P
Carl Hall, OF
 1995
Jason Adams, SS
Casey Blake, 3B
Mike Drumrights, P
Braden Looper, P
 1996
Casey Blake, 3B
Braden Looper, P
Travis Wyckoff, P/OF
Ben Thomas, P/DH
 1998
Marc Bluma, P
Kevin Hooper, 2B
Pat Magness, 1B
Jeff Ryan, OF
Zach Sorensen, SS
 1999
Marc Bluma, P
Kevin Hooper, 2B
Pat Magness, 1B

 2000
Blake Blasi, 2B
Pat Magness, 1B
 2002
Brian Burgamy, 2B
John Tetuan, P
 2004
Brandon Green, 3B
Mike Pelfrey, P
Logan Sorensen, 1B
 2005
Mike Pelfrey, P
 2006
Aaron Shafer, P
Damon Sublett, 2B
 2008
Anthony Capra, P
Andy Dirks, OF
Conor Gillaspie, 3B
Rob Musgrave, P
 2010
Jordan Cooper, P
 2011
Charlie Lowell, P
Chris O'Brien, C
 2014
Casey Gillaspie, 1B
  2018
Alec Bohm, 3B

All College World Series

 1982
Tim Gaskell, OF
Loren Hibbs, OF
Russ Morman, DH
Bryan Oelkers, P
Jim Thomas, 2B
 1988
Mark Standiford, 2B

 1989
Jim Audley, OF
Greg Brummett, P
Todd Dreifort, P
Pat Meares, SS
Jim Newlin, P
Eric Wedge, C

 1991
Jim Audley, OF
Kennie Steenstra, P
 1993
Jason Adams, SS
Casey Blake, 3B

Current and former major league players

 Ken Berry
 Lloyd Bishop
 Casey Blake
 Jaime Bluma
 Greg Brummett
 Joe Carter
 Darren Dreifort
 Larry Foss
 Conor Gillaspie
 Tyler Green
 Dave Haas
 Don Heinkel
 Claude Hendrix
 Koyie Hill
 Kevin Hooper
 Kris Johnson
 Mike Lansing
 Don Lock
 Braden Looper
 Pat Meares
 Doug Mirabelli
 Russ Morman
 Bryan Oelkers
 Mike Pelfrey
 Adam Peterson
 Nate Robertson
 Daryl Spencer
 Kennie Steenstra
 Phil Stephenson
 Eric Wedge
 Rick Wrona
 Alec Bohm

Source: Baseball Reference

See also
 List of NCAA Division I baseball programs

References

External links